James Tuller Cintrón was the designated Puerto Rico Police Superintendent from December 2013 - April 2014, Tuller asked that his nomination as head of the PRPD be withdrawn so he could attend to personal matters.  Prior to joining the PRPD, Tuller was the Chief of the New York City Police Department Transportation Bureau. Tuller has been a policeman since 1973 and holds a bachelor's degree in political science from John Jay College of Criminal Justice  and a master's degree in public administration.

See also
 List of Superintendents of the Puerto Rico Police

Notes

References

John Jay College of Criminal Justice alumni
New York City Police Department officers
Superintendents of the Puerto Rico Police
Year of birth missing (living people)
Living people